Wilkins Nunatak' is the northeasternmost of three nunataks. It lies 6 nautical miles (11 km) southwest of Ickes Mountains in coastal Marie Byrd Land. Mapped by United States Geological Survey (USGS) from surveys and U.S. Navy air photos, 1959–65. Named by Advisory Committee on Antarctic Names (US-ACAN) for Melvin L. Wilkins, QM3, U.S. Navy, Quartermaster aboard USS Glacier in exploration of this coast, 1961–62.

Nunataks of Marie Byrd Land